John Clifton "Cliff" Patton (July 29, 1923 – November 9, 2002) was a professional American football player who played guard for six seasons for the Philadelphia Eagles and the Chicago Cardinals.

1923 births
2002 deaths
American football offensive guards
TCU Horned Frogs football players
Chicago Cardinals players
Philadelphia Eagles players
People from Callahan County, Texas